State Route 141 (SR 141) is an east–west highway crossing through southeast Ohio, though it predominantly runs more north–south.  Its western terminus is at U.S. Route 52 in Ironton.  The eastern terminus at State Route 7 is in Gallipolis. The route is very scenic as it travels through rural areas of Lawrence and Gallia Counties.  The road is hilliest in the westernmost .  As you move further east, the road becomes somewhat flatter as it often parallels Symmes Creek.  Traveling the road from end to end, one will cross Symmes Creek five times and pass through several communities including Ironton, Hecla, Kitts Hill, Aid, Wilgus, Arabia, Waterloo, Cadmus, Gage, Centenary, and Gallipolis. Symmes Valley High School and Symmes Valley Elementary School are also located along State Route 141, just to the east of Aid. Because of the close proximity to Symmes Creek through the central portion of the route, the roadway is sometimes flooded in rainy periods.  This occurs most notably just south of Cadmus.  The route in Gallia County is scenic in that there are several Amish settlements.

Major junctions

References

141
Transportation in Lawrence County, Ohio
Transportation in Gallia County, Ohio